Eric Skelton (13 April 1881 – 11 June 1942) was a Barbadian cricketer. He played in one first-class match for the Barbados cricket team in 1901/02.

See also
 List of Barbadian representative cricketers

References

External links
 

1881 births
1942 deaths
Barbadian cricketers
Barbados cricketers
Sportspeople from Prestwich
British people in British Barbados